Ichneutica eris is a moth of the family Noctuidae. It is endemic to New Zealand. It is found in alpine habitat in the South Island and is on the wing from November to February. The species is attracted to light.

Taxonomy 
This species was first described by Robert Hoare in 2019. The holotype specimen was collected near the Homer Tunnel by John Salmon in 1946. I. eris was named in honour of Eris in light of the difficulty of the confusion this species has caused lepidopterists.

Description 
Adults of this species are brownish-grey in colour, with whitish markings on the forewings as well as greyish dots along the forewing edge. The hindwings are grey in colour. The wingspan range for the male of the species is between 37 to 46 mm, and for the female is between 43 to 51mm.

This species is similar in appearance to both I. cana and I. fibriata.

Habitat and geographic range 
This species is endemic to New Zealand and can be found throughout the South Island in alpine habitat. This species overlaps with the range of I. cana although it appears to be more restricted in range than that species. However I. eris can be found in the mountains surrounding Nelson whereas I. cana is not present in that locality.

Life history 
Little is known of the life history of this species. However it is possible that the larvae exist on short alpine grasses and pupate on bare soil.

Behaviour 
Adults of this species are on the wing from November to February. This species also appears to be attracted to light.

References

Moths described in 2019
Moths of New Zealand
 Noctuinae
Endemic fauna of New Zealand
Taxa named by Robert Hoare
Endemic moths of New Zealand